Ion Butmalai (9 October 1964 – 9 December 2014) was a Moldovan politician and a deputy in Parliament of Moldova from 2009 to 2014, member of the Liberal Democratic Party of Moldova.

Biography 
Ion Butmalai was born on October 9, 1964, in Tigheci village, Leova district, Moldavian SSR, Soviet Union. In 1982-1984 he satisfied the military service within the border guards. In 1984-1985 he was a policeman driver at the Leova Police Station. 
Butmalai was a member of the Parliament of Moldova from 2009 until his death in 2014. Between 1985-1987 he studied at the Special Middle School of the Ministry of Internal Affairs of the USSR in Oryol, Russian SFSR, USSR, at the specialty - JURIST, the specialization - Administrative practice of the State Auto Police. From 1991 to 1996 he studied at the Ştefan cel Mare Police Academy as a jurist specialization - Practice and Administration in the OAI, Master - Criminal Law.

Death
On December 9, 2014, around 12:00, Ion Butmalai was found dead by his wife, shot in his chest, from his own legally-owned gun, in the garage of his home in Cahul. It is known that he would have left behind a farewell note dated December 9, 2014 at 8:50, in which he blames  in his death Vlad Filat (president of the LDPM) Vlad Plahotniuc (the first vice-president of the DPM), Valeriu Streleț (the first vice-president of the LDPM), Liliana Palihovici (vice-president of the LDPM), Vadim Pistrinciuc (vice-president of the LDPM), Victor Rosca (general secretary of the LDPM ).  He was 50. He was buried with military honors on December 11th. 

Ion Butmalai was married and had two sons for 24 and 16 years.

References

External links
  Official website
  Biography of Ion Butmalai at his own site
  Ion Butmalai at Parliament of Moldova's website
  Biography of Ion Butmalai at Liberal Democratic Party of Moldova's website

1964 births
2014 deaths
Liberal Democratic Party of Moldova MPs
Moldovan MPs 2009–2010
Politicians who committed suicide
People from Leova District
People from Cahul
Suicides by firearm in Moldova